Grinshill is a small village, and civil parish in Shropshire, England, United Kingdom. The parish is one of the smallest in the district. The population of the civil parish at the 2011 census was 274.

Grinshill is near (east) to the village of Clive. The A49 runs just further to the east of the village.

Stone has been quarried at Grinshill since at least the twelfth century. Grinshill stone is a Triassic sandstone that was described by the Pevsner Architectural Guides as the "pre-eminent" building stone of Shropshire, and has been used in buildings as varied as Haughmond Abbey, Shrewsbury railway station and Welsh Bridge. Most notably, Grinshill stone has been used to make the lintels and door surround of Number 10 Downing Street and in the building of Chequers.

The village church is All Saints.

See also
Listed buildings in Grinshill

References

External links

Civil parishes in Shropshire
Villages in Shropshire
Hills of Shropshire